This is a timeline of historical events relating to Northfield, Minnesota.

Nineteenth century
1851- The U.S. government imposed a treaty on the Dakota people, Siouan-speaking Native Americans who had been in this territory since at least the 17th century.  Indigenous peoples of varying cultures had lived in the area for thousands of years before that. The treaty allowed European-American settlement in southern Minnesota.  Most of the Dakota were removed to a reservation near New Ulm, Minnesota. The treaty marked part of the decline of the Dakotah Nation, adversely affected by infectious disease and warfare. The people have undergone a revival since the later 20th century, however.  The treaty paved the way for the foundation of Northfield.

1851- William Marshall surveyed land and helped John W. North, a migrant from Syracuse, New York, pick out land to build mills and a town, to be called Northfield.

1854- May, Daniel Kuykendall was the first European-American pioneer to arrive in the area.  Others soon followed.

1855- On August 17, 1855, North purchased 160 acres (647,000 m²) of land from each of the other two original pre-emptors.

1856- September, Miron W. Skinner and his brother moved to Northfield and opened the second town store.  He was instrumental in the establishment of Northfield College, now known as Carleton College. (See 1916 note about building of Skinner Chapel on the campus.)

1856- Herman Jenkins built the first hotel in Northfield.

1857 John L. Schofield came to Northfield and was the town’s first doctor. He built the first drugstore, which was attached to his house. John North suffered financial failure in the Panic of 1857.

1859- Charles Augustus Wheaton bought John North's financial interests and became one of the early town leaders.  
		
1865- Jesse Ames moved to town and bought mills from Charles Augustus Wheaton. 
		
1866- The Minnesota Conference of Congregational Churches and Charles M. Goodsell established Northfield College, later named Carleton College.  
		
1867- Wheaton and Goodsell each gave a  plot of land to the fledgling Northfield College to establish the college campus north of the main part of town.

1871- Northfield College changes its name to Carleton College, after benefactor William Carleton of Charlestown, Massachusetts, who had given US$50,000 to the fledgling institution. 
		
1875- Hiram Scriver was elected first mayor of Northfield.

1874- St. Olaf College was founded by Rev. B.J. Muus, Harold Thorson and two area farmers, members of the Norwegian Lutheran Church.

1876- September 7, Attempted robbery of the First National Bank by the James-Younger gang.  Bank treasurer Joseph Lee Heywood was killed after refusing to open bank safe.

1877- James D. Archer opened the second hotel in the Northfield area. (see 1959 note about Dallas Haas below)

1882- W. S. Pattee was superintendent of schools and also taught at Carleton College. Later he practiced law in Northfield, and became dean of the law school at the University of Minnesota.

1884—Joel P. Heatwole arrived in Northfield. He bought The News and made it the leading weekly newspaper in the state. Technologically, it was a model of what a printing office should be.

1889- Margaret Evans' administrative title at Carleton College was changed to “lady principal” and in 1898 to “dean of the women’s department.”  Known as Dean Evans, she was a towering figure in Carleton history.

1893- J. C. Nutting, president of First National Bank, planned and financed the construction of the Nutting Block to house the Northfield Knitting Company.

1895- W. F. Schilling came to Northfield.  Once an editor of the Northfield News, Schilling became a Holstein breeder and a prominent agriculturalist in the state and the nation. He wrote the book, "My first Eighty Years”, which was published in 1952 by Mohn Printing.

1897- Link Fey, built one of the first successful gasoline-powered automobiles in Minnesota.

1898- Laura M. Baker opened a school to serve special students under the age of fourteen.

Twentieth century
1914- Northfield adopted a town slogan, “Northfield: Cows, Colleges and Contentment.” The slogan was replaced by "Northfield: A Special Place," in the 1960s. In the 1980s, sentiment, a sense of humor, and marketing savvy lead to the renewed use of the old slogan.

1916- Emily Willey Skinner, wife of Miron W. Skinner, gave a large, Gothic style chapel to Carleton College on its 50th anniversary.

1918- W. M. Savage founded the Dan Patch Train Line.

1924- R.C. Phillips joined the fire department, where he served for 42 years as chief. He holds the record in the U.S. for being present at every fire fought by his firemen.

1927- John S. Campbell founds of Malt-O-Meal.

1934- George Gibson, who taught geology and coached football at Carleton College (His 611 career victories is the second-best among coaches with four or more seasons as the head coach.) He received many honors and awards in his field, among them election to the Petroleum Museum Hall of Fame in 2001.

1955- G. T. Schjeldahl started Sheldahl Company. It manufactured laminated products such as fabric for the inflatable "Echo" satellites and under-dashboard circuits for cars. After a merger in 2004, it became Multek Flexible Circuits, Inc.

1959- Dallas Haas, a building contractor, moved to Northfield with his wife Sandra and found a ready housing market. In June 1981, Haas and his wife, Sandra, purchased the Stuart Hotel and began work on what became Division Street’s most famous building (after the First National Bank), the Archer House. Dallas Haas Construction was named Industry of the Year by the Northfield Industrial Corporation in 1983.

1967- Maggie Lee becomes Editor of The Northfield News.

1975- Longtime Northfield News writer and editor, Maggie Lee, helped found the Northfield Historical Society. She was awarded the Hometown Spirit Award October 19, 1993.

Twenty-first century
2004- Maggie Lee celebrated 50 years in journalism. She continues to write columns and features for the newspaper.

2008- Mary Rossing becomes the first female mayor and a female majority is elected to the city council for the first time.

References

Timelines of cities in the United States
United States history timelines
Histories of cities in Minnesota